Ancylosis deserticola is a species of snout moth in the genus Ancylosis. It was described by Staudinger, in 1870. It is found in Spain, Hungary, Romania, Bulgaria and Russia.

The wingspan is 14–17 mm.

References

Moths described in 1870
deserticola
Moths of Europe